Sydney Adolphus Boyd  (7 January 1857 – 17 May 1947) was Archdeacon of Bath from 1924 to 1938.

Born in Landour in 1857, Boyd was educated at Clifton College and Worcester College, Oxford. He was called to the bar at the Inner Temple in 1880. However, he chose an ecclesiastical path and was shortly appointed curate of Holy Trinity, Hampstead. He held incumbencies in Norwich and Macclesfield; after which he was rector of Bath Abbey from 1902 to 1938. On 25 June 1925, he was amongst the officiating clergy at the opening of the war memorial chapel at Monkton Combe School. He died in Bath in 1947, aged 90.

Notes

1857 births
People from Dehradun district
Alumni of Worcester College, Oxford
People educated at Clifton College
Archdeacons of Bath
1947 deaths